The Red River Athletic Conference is a college athletic conference affiliated with the National Association of Intercollegiate Athletics (NAIA). The conference's 13 member institutions are located in Texas, Louisiana, and New Mexico.

History

The Red River Athletic Conference began competition in fall 1998 with 16 charter members. The conference at present counts 13 members, one of the most recent additions being Texas A&M University–Texarkana in 2016. In 2019, St. Thomas Houston announced its departure from the conference to join the Southern Collegiate Athletic Conference (SCAC) of the NCAA Division III as a provisional member. In March 2020, Texas A&M University–San Antonio was approved for membership into the NAIA and it was simultaneously announced that the Jaguars would begin competition in the conference starting in the 2020–21 academic year, followed by Xavier University of Louisiana and Louisiana Christian University (formerly Louisiana College) in September and October respectively. Xavier and Louisiana Christian officially joined the RRAC for the 2021–22 academic year.

On January 20, 2022, the Gulf Coast Athletic Conference (GCAC) invited founding Red River member Wiley College to become the GCAC's first Texas institution, effective later in July.

Chronological timeline
 1998 - The Red River Athletic Conference (RRAC) was founded. Charter members included Bacone College, Houston Baptist University (now Houston Christian University), Huston–Tillotson University, Jarvis Christian College (now Jarvis Christian University), Langston University, Northwestern Oklahoma State University, Northwood University–Texas, Paul Quinn College, the University of Science and Arts of Oklahoma, the University of the Southwest, Southwestern Adventist University, Southwestern Assemblies of God University, the University of Texas Permian Basin, Texas College, and Wiley College beginning the 1998–99 academic year.
 2000 - USAO left the RRAC to join the Sooner Athletic Conference (SAC) after the 1999–2000 academic year.
 2001 - Texas Wesleyan University joined the RRAC in the 2001–02 academic year.
 2002 - Two institutions left the RRAC to join their respective new home primary conferences: Northwestern Oklahoma State to the Sooner, and Southwestern Adventist to become an Independent within the United States Collegiate Athletic Association (USCAA), both effective after the 2001–02 academic year.
 2002 - Texas A&M International University joined the RRAC in the 2002–03 academic year.
 2006 - Texas–Permian Basin and Texas A&M–International left the RRAC and the NAIA to join the Division II ranks of the National Collegiate Athletic Association (NCAA) and the Heartland Conference after the 2005–06 academic year.
 2006 - The University of Texas at Brownsville joined the RRAC in the 2006–07 academic year.
 2007 - Houston Christian left the RRAC and the NAIA to join the NCAA Division I ranks as an independent (which would later join the Great West Conference beginning the 2008–09 academic year) after the 2006–07 academic year.
 2008 - Our Lady of the Lake University joined the RRAC in the 2008–09 academic year.
 2010 - Louisiana State University Shreveport joined the RRAC in the 2010–11 academic year.
 2012 - The University of St. Thomas joined the RRAC in the 2012–13 academic year.
 2013 - Northwood–Texas, SAGU and Texas Wesleyan left the RRAC to join the Sooner after the 2012–13 academic year.
 2014 - Louisiana State University in Alexandria joined the RRAC in the 2014–15 academic year.
 2015 - Two institutions left the RRAC to join their respective new home primary conferences: Texas–Brownsville (UTB) athletics was discontinued due to the merger with the University of Texas–Pan American (UTPA) to become the University of Texas–Rio Grande Valley (UTRGV), and Bacone to join the Sooner after the 2014–15 academic year.
 2015 - The University of Houston–Victoria joined the RRAC in the 2015–16 academic year.
 2016 - Texas A&M University–Texarkana joined the RRAC in the 2016–17 academic year.
 2018 - Langston left the RRAC to join the Sooner after the 2017–18 academic year.
 2019 - St. Thomas (Tex.) left the RRAC to join the NCAA Division III ranks and the Southern Collegiate Athletic Conference (SCAC) after the 2018–19 academic year.
 2020 - Texas A&M University–San Antonio joined the RRAC in the 2020–21 academic year.
 2021 - Louisiana College and Xavier University of Louisiana joined the RRAC in the 2021–22 academic year.
 2022 - Wiley left the RRAC to join the Gulf Coast Athletic Conference (GCAC) after the 2021–22 academic year.

Member schools

Current members
The RRAC currently has 13 full members, all but five are private schools:

Notes

Former members
The RRAC had 14 former full members, all but five were private schools:

Notes

Membership timeline

Sports

The Red River Athletic Conference sponsors championships in seven men's and eight women's sports.

References

External links

 
College sports in Louisiana
College sports in New Mexico
College sports in Texas